Julio Rocha may refer to:

Julio Rocha López (1950–2018), Nicaraguan football administrator
Júlio Rocha (born 1979), Brazilian actor